The Joint Functional Component Command for Intelligence, Surveillance and Reconnaissance (JFCC ISR) was a subordinate command of the United States Strategic Command, one of the nine Unified Combatant Commands under the United States Department of Defense (DOD) and co-located with the Defense Intelligence Agency (DIA). It served as the center for planning, execution and assessment of the United States military's global Intelligence, Surveillance, and Reconnaissance operations from 2005-2016; a key enabler to achieving global situational awareness.  In 2016 JFCC-ISR was realigned to the Joint Staff.

Mission
In support of USSTRATCOM's global ISR mission, JFCC-ISR develops strategies and plans; integrates national, DoD, and international partner capabilities; and executes DoD ISR operations to satisfy combatant command and national operational and intelligence requirements.

Mission specifics
Established in March 2005 as a component of USSTRATCOM, and officially active on 4 November 2005, JFCC-ISR conducts planning to employ DoD ISR resources to meet national, departmental and combatant command requirements. In coordination with the Defense Intelligence Agency (DIA), National Geospatial-Intelligence Agency (NGA), National Security Agency (NSA), National Reconnaissance Office (NRO), United States Joint Forces Command (USJFCOM), the military services and other mission partners, JFCC-ISR ensures the integration of DOD and national ISR efforts to satisfy combatant command and national operational and intelligence requirements. JFCC-ISR synchronizes the use of national, DoD, and allies’ ISR capabilities with employment of theater ISR resources and, when appropriate, with other collection activities, including human intelligence, measurement and signature intelligence, signals intelligence, imagery intelligence, and open-source intelligence.

JFCC-ISR planning includes an assessment of potential risks and intelligence gaps associated with proposed options, and recommends actions to mitigate risks and gaps. When options involve use of theater ISR assets, JFCC-ISR communicates with theater and service operations and intelligence staffs to coordinate operations and to resolve competition for ISR resources. JFCC-ISR monitors the execution of planned ISR activities. JFCC-ISR generates an ISR Global Situation Awareness display and shares data from that display with appropriate entities. As data is collected and becomes usable, JFCC-ISR ensures its availability to the widest body of operators, planners and analytic organizations. JFCC-ISR evaluates collected data and recommends adjustments to plans or other actions to improve collection results.

Divisions
Upon transfer to the Joint Staff, the J-32’s four divisions were renamed: Mission Management, Force Management, ISR Assessment, and Operations & Integration.  These divisions were specifically responsible for the following:
Develop and maintain a Global Situational Awareness display of deployed ISR
Participate in adaptive planning to support combatant commands' Intelligence Campaign Planning efforts
Recommend allocation strategies based on operational and intelligence requirements
Help combatant commands synchronize DoD collection with activities of national/international ISR collectors
Recommend actions to persuade or dissuade adversaries through the use of ISR operations
Manage the special activities approval process to synchronize and optimize use of ISR assets
Help develop courses of action and options to mitigate consequent risks and gaps
Use modeling/simulation tools to test support plans and determine optimal allocation of ISR assets
Assess/identify/define gaps, shortfalls, priorities and redundancies of ISR capabilities
Integrate ISR Special Activities in support of combatant command requirements

Realignment to Joint Staff
JFCC-ISR’s functions moved from USSTRATCOM and DIA to the Joint Staff in late 2016.  The new office was named Deputy Director, Intelligence, Surveillance and Reconnaissance Operations (J-32) and Director, Joint Intelligence, Surveillance and Reconnaissance Operations Center (JISROC).  Rear Adm. Brett Heimbigner was the last Commander of JFCC-ISR and the first Director of J-32.   The   Secretary of Defense designated the Joint ISR Operations Center (JISROC) as a Chairman’s Controlled Activity (CCA) on 9 November 2017.   The J-32 serves “dual-hatted” as both the Director of the JISROC.

References

See also
Defense Intelligence Agency (DIA)
United States Strategic Command (USSTRATCOM)

Defense Intelligence Agency
Joint Chiefs of Staff